Raiz (also Romanized as Rā’īz) is a village in Ashkara Rural District, Fareghan District, Hajjiabad County, Hormozgan Province, Iran. At the 2006 census, its population was 88, in 30 families.

References 

Populated places in Hajjiabad County